"Cry Not for Me" is a song first recorded by American country singer Patsy Cline. It was composed by Don Hecht and Jack Moon. It was released as a single in early 1959 via Decca Records and was produced by Owen Bradley. It was among a handful of singles released on the Decca label that were unsuccessful for Cline following a major hit in 1957.

Background
In 1957, Patsy Cline reached the top of the country charts and crossed over onto the pop charts with the song "Walkin' After Midnight". Signed to Four Star Records, her success not be duplicated with the label again. Following a recording session held in January 1959, Decca Records (which leased Four Star's music) released her next single, which included "Cry Not for Me". Although the B-side was recorded in January 1959, "Cry Not for Me" was first cut on December 13, 1957. The session was produced by Owen Bradley and the song was composed by Don Hecht and Jack Moon.

Release and reception
On February 23, 1957, "Cry Not for Me" was released as a seven inch single on Decca Records. It was backed by "Yes I Understand" on the B-side. The single was not commercially successful. Four Star's chief label head, Bill McCall, heard that Cline was disappointed and was looking for alternative record labels. In an effort to cover himself, McCall arranged for Cline to return to the studio and record two demo sessions for Four Star. Cline also promoted the single on a televised performance of Ozark Jubilee and guest-starred on the Grand Ole Opry. The song received a positive response from AllMusic, who called the track an example of "torchy pop".

Track listing
7" vinyl single
 "Cry Not for Me" 
 "Yes, I Understand" – 2:47

References

Footnotes

Books

 

1959 singles
Decca Records singles
Patsy Cline songs
Song recordings produced by Owen Bradley
1959 songs